Tetramelas is a genus of lichenized fungi in the family Caliciaceae.

Species
Tetramelas allisoniae 
Tetramelas anisomerus 
Tetramelas austropapillatus 
Tetramelas chloroleucus 
Tetramelas cladocarpizus 
Tetramelas concinnus 
Tetramelas confusus  – New Zealand
Tetramelas coquimbensis 
Tetramelas darbishirei 
Tetramelas filsonii 
Tetramelas fuegiensis 
Tetramelas geophilus 
Tetramelas graminicola 
Tetramelas granulosus 
Tetramelas grimmiae 
Tetramelas inordinatus 
Tetramelas insignis 
Tetramelas kopuwaianus 
Tetramelas lokenensis 
Tetramelas nelsonii 
Tetramelas papillatus 
Tetramelas peruviensis 
Tetramelas phaeophysciae 
Tetramelas poeltii 
Tetramelas pulverulentus 
Tetramelas regiomontanus 
Tetramelas subpedicellatus 
Tetramelas terricola 
Tetramelas thiopolizus 
Tetramelas triphragmioides 
Tetramelas weberianus

References

Caliciales
Lichen genera
Caliciales genera
Taxa described in 1852